Neopalpa is a genus of moths in the family Gelechiidae. They are found in California, Arizona, and northern Mexico. Neopalpa is classified in the tribe Gnorimoschemini and is most closely related to the genera Ochrodia and Ephysteris.

Species
The genus contains the following two species:

 Neopalpa donaldtrumpi
 Neopalpa neonata

References

Gnorimoschemini
Moths of North America